The 1952 United States presidential election in Minnesota took place on November 4, 1952, as part of the 1952 United States presidential election. Voters chose 11 electors, or representatives to the Electoral College, who voted for president and vice president.

Minnesota was won by the Republican candidate, former Supreme Allied Commander Europe General of the Army Dwight D. Eisenhower won the state over Illinois governor Adlai Stevenson by a margin of 154,753 votes, or 11.22%, which made Minnesota about 0.3% more Republican than the nation-at-large. Eisenhower went on to win the election nationally, with 442 electoral votes and a commanding 10.9% lead over Stevenson in the popular vote.

Incumbent President Harry S. Truman was the last president who was unaffected by the term limit imposed under the 22nd Amendment, but decided as early as 1950 that he would not seek another term. Eisenhower was the first Republican presidential nominee to win Minnesota (which had otherwise normally been a Democratic stronghold) since the Stock Market Crash of 1929 and the first Republican elected to the presidency and to win Minnesota since Herbert Hoover did so in 1928. Until the 2016 presidential election, this was the last time that the state was more Republican than the national average. This was also the last time Swift County voted Republican until 2016. To this date, this is the last election in which a Republican presidential candidate won Minnesota by double digits, as well as the last time a non-incumbent Republican won Minnesota.

On March 18, 1952, Minnesota held a presidential primary for the first time since 1916.

Primary elections

Republican primary
The Republican primary took place on March 18, 1952. Harold Stassen and Edward C. Slettedahl were the two candidates on the ballot.

Democratic primary

The Democratic primary took place on March 18, 1952. Senator Hubert Humphrey was the only candidate on the ballot.

Results

Results by county

See also
 United States presidential elections in Minnesota

References

1952
Min
1952 Minnesota elections